Pakrac is a town in western Slavonia, Croatia, population 4,842, total municipality population 8,460 (census 2011). Pakrac is located on the road and railroad connecting the regions of Posavina and Podravina.

Name
In Croatian the town is known as Pakrac, in German as Pakratz, in Hungarian as Pakrác.

History
The town was first mentioned in 1237. It was captured by the Ottoman Empire in 1543. It was initially a kaza centre in the Sanjak of Pojega between 1543 and 1552, then in the Sanjak of Pakrac in the Rumelia Eyalet between 1552 and 1559. Later it was the centre of the Sanjak of Pakrac between 1559 and 1601, when the sanjak seat was moved to Cernik. The Ottoman rule in Pakrac lasted until the Austrians captured it in 1691. In the late 19th and early 20th centuries, Pakrac was part of the Požega County of the Kingdom of Croatia-Slavonia.

Hostilities during the Yugoslav wars in Pakrac began on August 18, 1991, when Serb troops shelled the town from positions in the nearby hills. The Croats in Pakrac quickly organized in self-defense units. In a ceasefire signed in January 1992, the town was divided into Croatian and Serbian sectors. UNPROFOR was stationed at the demarcation line. In the Serbian part of Pakrac, Krajina Serb military leadership operated the Bučje concentration camp (18 km outside Pakrac), where Croat civilians and Serbs who opposed the Krajina government were imprisoned and killed. In early May 1995, east Pakrac was retaken by Croats in Operation Flash in the last phase of the Croatian War of Independence. Serbs who were living in east Pakrac soon left the area in large numbers.

Demographics
In the census of 1991, the municipality of Pakrac (today cities Pakrac and Lipik) encompassed a different, larger area and its population was as follows: 

In the census of 2011, the municipality of Pakrac comprised:

Settlements
The municipality consists of 42 settlements:

 Badljevina, population 733
 Batinjani, population 38
 Bjelajci, population 0
 Branešci, population 48
 Brusnik, population 19
 Bučje, population 17
 Cicvare, population 0
 Cikote, population 7
 Dereza, population 13
 Donja Obrijež, population 235
 Donja Šumetlica, population 6
 Donji Grahovljani, population 33
 Dragović, population 64
 Glavica, population 12
 Gornja Obrijež, population 81
 Gornja Šumetlica, population 65
 Gornji Grahovljani, population 8
 Jakovci, population 0
 Kapetanovo Polje, population 35
 Koturić, population 11
 Kraguj, population 77
 Kričke, population 19
 Kusonje, population 308
 Lipovac, population 0
 Mali Banovac, population 13
 Mali Budići, population 2
 Novi Majur, population 104
 Omanovac, population 147
 Ožegovci, population 34
 Pakrac, population 4,842
 Ploštine, population 108
 Popovci, population 10
 Prekopakra, population 1,066
 Prgomelje, population 1
 Rogulje, population 3
 Srednji Grahovljani, population 0
 Stari Majur, population 24
 Španovica, population 23
 Tisovac, population 4
 Toranj, population 75
 Veliki Banovac, population 171
 Veliki Budići, population 4

Notable people from Pakrac
 Ivan Šreter,  Croatian physician who was persecuted by Yugoslav authorities for using the Croatian language.He was killed in 1991 by Serbs in the Croatian War of Independence.
Zlatko Aleksovski, Bosnian-Croat prison commander and convicted war criminal
 Smilja Avramov, Serbian international law expert
 Zoran Erceg, Serbian basketball player
 Jadranka Kosor, former Prime Minister of Croatia
Žarko Potočnjak, Croatian theatre, television and film actor.
Sven Lasta, Croatian television and film actor.
 Slobodan Selenić, Serbian writer.

References

Sources

External links
  

Slavonia
Cities and towns in Croatia
Populated places in Požega-Slavonia County
Požega County
13th-century establishments in Croatia
1237 establishments in Europe